The Minister of Rural Development and Land Reform is a Minister in the Cabinet of South Africa.
Since May 2019 the portfolio was merged into the Department of Agriculture, Land Reform and Rural Development.

References

External links
Department of Agriculture, Land Reform and Rural Development

Lists of political office-holders in South Africa